S710 may refer to :
 HTC S710, a mobile phone
 NW-S710, a Sony walkman series 
 Sony Ericsson S710, a Sony Ericsson mobile phone